Brendan Sexton may refer to:

 Brendan Sexton III (born 1980), American actor
 Brendan Sexton (triathlete) (born 1985), Australian triathlete